Pygostolus is a genus of braconid wasps in the family Braconidae. There are about eight described species in Pygostolus.

Species
These eight species belong to the genus Pygostolus:
 Pygostolus clavatus Brues, 1933 c g
 Pygostolus falcatus (Nees, 1834) c g
 Pygostolus minax Belokobylskij, 2000 c g
 Pygostolus multiarticulatus (Ratzeburg, 1852) c g
 Pygostolus patriarchicus Brues, 1937 c g
 Pygostolus sonorensis Cameron, 1887 c g
 Pygostolus sticticus (Fabricius, 1798) c g
 Pygostolus tibetensis Chen & van Achterberg, 1997 c g
Data sources: i = ITIS, c = Catalogue of Life, g = GBIF, b = Bugguide.net

References

Further reading

External links

 

Euphorinae